Zero Gravity Corporation (also known as Zero-G, stylized as zero G) is an American company based in Exploration Park, Florida, formerly of Fort Lauderdale, Florida, which operates weightless flights from United States airports. Zero-G is governed under Part 121 of FAA regulations (as are all US commercial passenger and cargo airlines) enabling the company to cater to both tourists and researchers alike.

History
Founded by entrepreneur Peter Diamandis, astronaut Byron K. Lichtenberg, and NASA engineer Ray Cronise, the company has been operating weightless flights since 2004. Over 15000 were clients as of November 2017. A number of notable passengers have been on weightless flights run by the company, including Penn Jillette and Teller, Martha Stewart, Burt Rutan, Buzz Aldrin, Casey Neistat, John Carmack, and Tony Hawk. Theoretical physicist Stephen Hawking also completed a shortened flight on April 26, 2007.

In April 2006, Zero-G became the first commercial company to gain permission from the Kennedy Space Center to use its space shuttle runway and landing facilities.
On April 21, 2007, it began regular flights from Las Vegas for the general public at ticket prices of US$3,675.  Good Morning America aired promotional footage featuring the show's weatherman Sam Champion during a preview flight in Ohio.
On December 9, 2007, Zero G hosted Adam Savage and Jamie Hyneman of MythBusters to disprove the conspiracy theory that the Apollo Moon landing was a hoax.

In March 2008, the company was acquired by Space Adventures.

On April 20, 2011, a Safety Approval was granted to Zero-G by the FAA which allows the company to "...offer reduced gravity parabolic flights to prospective suborbital launch operators to meet the applicable components of the crew qualification and training requirements outlined in the Code of Federal Regulations (14 C.F.R., Section 460.5)."

Flight experience

, the price of a flight for a single passenger starts at US$8,200.
The unique Weightless Weddings Experience is also included in the list of services
 Noah and Erin Fulmor were the first couple to get married in weightlessness.

Fliers undergo a brief training session before embarking. A flight lasts 90 to 100 minutes, and consists of fifteen parabolas, each of which simulates about 30 seconds of reduced gravity: one that simulates Martian gravity (one-third of Earth's), two that simulate Lunar gravity (one-sixth of Earth's), and 12 that simulate weightlessness.

Fleet
The company owns and operates a Boeing 727-227F Advanced, registration N794AJ, dubbed "G-FORCE ONE". It flies parabolic arcs similar to those of NASA's KC-135 reduced gravity aircraft.

Zero-G research programs

Zero-G’s Weightless Lab research program provides access to low gravity environments for technological development, which have been used in biomedical and pharmaceutical research, fluid and fundamental physics, materials science, aerospace engineering, space exploration hardware and human space habitation. 

Past clients, such as Ball Aerospace & Technologies Corporation, California Institute of Technology, Harvard University, Jet Propulsion Laboratory, Mayo Clinic, Purdue University, and Tethers Unlimited, claim that parabolic flights support their space research objectives and test readiness.

Research flights for NASA
NASA has a microgravity services contract with Zero-G, which provided the first flights under this contract on September 9 and 10, 2008. Flight time from Ellington Field near Johnson Space Center was provided for the FASTRACK Space Experiment Platform. The flights were funded by NASA's Strategic Capabilities and Assets Program.

See also
Reduced-gravity aircraft

References

External links 

 
 Farewell to Gravity (Wired article by Xeni Jardin)
 Notes on Zero-G flight by John Carmack (September 26, 2004)

Companies based in Florida